The 4Q126 (4QUnid gr) is an ancient Greek fragment and one of the Dead Sea Scrolls. The text of this manuscript is unknown and it has not been possible to identify it with any known LXX passage, a biblical verse or from some other literary work. Palaeographically it dates from the first century BCE or early first century CE.

History 

It was published in 1992 by Patrick W. Skehan, Eugene Ulrich and J. E. Sanderson in Discoveries in the Judean Desert IX, pp. 219-221. Currently the manuscript is housed in the Rockefeller Museum in Jerusalem.

Description 

According to Devorah Dimant, the manuscript is unbiblical, and "too fragmentary for any identification". Eugene Ulrich wrote that "it cannot be determined whether 4QUnid gr (4Q126) was part of the LXX".

The word κύριος 

In one of the fragments the word κύριος appears, which is translated from the Koine Greek as lord.

Fragment 1

1 ]σ̣ποδ·[ 
2 ]·ν και κυ[ 
3 ]νων ασ ...[ 
4 ]φρο ...[ 

Romanization

1 ]spod·[ 
2 ]·n kai ky[ 
3 ]nōn as ...[ 
4 ]phro ...[ 

According to Meyer, in fragment 1, line 2 it reads κύ, and he affirm: "obviously, many [...] words could begin with κύ, and the identification of the other words is uncertain. This fragment, then does not offer substantive evidence for reconstructing κύριος".

Fragment 2

1 ]σαπο̣·ρ[ 
2 ]σ̣κορπιδ[ 
3 ]ηεμπ[ 
4 ]ν̣εμπαση[ 
5 ]ε̣ιτε κυριο[ 

Romanization

1 ]sapo·r[ 
2 ]skorpid[ 
3 ]ēemp[ 
4 ]nempasē[ 
5 ]eite kyrio[ 

Regarding an occurrence of the word κύριο in fragment 2, line 5, Anthony R. Meyer states:

References

Sources 

Ancient Greek
1st-century BC manuscripts
1st-century manuscripts
Dead Sea Scrolls